The Nansha Hospital is a hospital in Taiping Island, Cijin District, Kaohsiung, Taiwan. It is the only hospital in the island, which provides care for Republic of China Armed Forces stationed in the island and civilians around the island in case of emergency.

History
The hospital was established in 1963.

Personnel
The hospital is staffed by two doctors, a dentist and two nurses.

Equipment
The hospital is equipped with 10 beds and video teleconference to connect it to mainland Kaohsiung.

See also
 List of hospitals in Taiwan

References

1963 establishments in Taiwan
Hospitals established in 1963
Hospitals in Kaohsiung